Pâncești is a commune in Neamț County, Western Moldavia, Romania. It is composed of five villages: Ciurea, Holm, Pâncești, Tălpălăi and Patricheni. These were part of Poienari Commune until 2004, when they were split off.

References

Communes in Neamț County
Localities in Western Moldavia